William Gottlieb Frank (December 1, 1878 – March 31, 1965) was an American track and field athlete who was born in Besigheim, Ludwigsburg, Baden-Württemberg, Germany. He arrived in the United States in 1889. Frank was a member of the Irish American Athletic Club and the Twenty-Second Regiment of the New York National Guard. Frank was also a police officer assigned to the New York City Police Department's 74th Precinct.

Competing as a member of the New York National Guard, Twenty-second Regiment, Frank won the 3-mile race for the championship of the Military Athletic League in 1905. He also won the national indoor 10-mile championship at Madison Square Garden in 1906.

He competed for the United States in the 1906 Intercalated Games held in Athens, Greece in the 5 mile race and the Marathon, where he came in third place, winning the bronze medal.

About 1902 he married Adelaide Wingrove, a native of Astoria, and they had one child, a daughter Adelaide Johanna, in 1903.

Notes

External links
 
 
 Winged Fist Organization

1878 births
1965 deaths
American male long-distance runners
Olympic bronze medalists for the United States in track and field
Medalists at the 1906 Intercalated Games
Athletes (track and field) at the 1906 Intercalated Games
Emigrants from the German Empire to the United States